Rivalta (from Latin Ripa Alta) may refer to:

Populated places
 Rivalta, Lesignano de' Bagni
 Rivalta, Pocenia
 Rivalta, Reggio Emilia
 Rivalta Bormida
 Rivalta sul Mincio
 Rivalta Scrivia
 Rivalta di Torino
 Rivalta Trebbia
 Rivalta Veronese

People with the surname
Augusto Rivalta (1835 or 1838 – 1925), Italian sculptor
Claudio Rivalta (born 1978), Italian footballer

Italian-language surnames